In Sumerian mythology, a me is one of the decrees of the divine that is foundational to those social institutions, religious practices, technologies, behaviors, mores, and human conditions that make civilization, as the Sumerians understood it, possible.  They are fundamental to the Sumerian understanding of the relationship between humanity and the gods.

Mythological origin and nature
The mes were originally collected by Enlil and then handed over to the guardianship of Enki, who was to broker them out to the various Sumerian centers, beginning with his own city of Eridu and continuing with Ur, Meluhha, and Dilmun.  This is described in the poem, "Enki and the World Order" which also details how he parcels out responsibility for various crafts and natural phenomena to the lesser gods.  Here the mes of various places are extolled but are not themselves clearly specified, and they seem to be distinct from the individual responsibilities of each divinity as they are mentioned in conjunction with specific places rather than gods. After a considerable amount of self-glorification on the part of Enki, his daughter Inanna comes before him with a complaint that she has been given short shrift on her divine spheres of influence.  Enki does his best to placate her by pointing out those she does in fact possess.

There is no direct connection implied in the mythological cycle between this poem and that which is our main source of information on the mes, "Inanna and Enki: The Transfer of the Arts of Civilization from Eridu to Uruk", but once again Inanna's discontent is a theme. She is the tutelary deity of Uruk and desires to increase its influence and glory by bringing the mes to it from Eridu.  She travels to Enki's Eridu shrine, the E-abzu, in her "boat of heaven", and asks the mes from him after he is drunk, whereupon he complies.  After she departs with them, he comes to his senses and notices they are missing from their usual place, and on being informed what he did with them attempts to retrieve them.  The attempt fails and Inanna triumphantly delivers them to Uruk.

The Sumerian tablets never actually describe what any of the mes look like, but they are clearly represented by physical objects of some sort. Not only are they stored in a prominent location in the E-abzu, but Inanna is able to display them to the people of Uruk after she arrives with them in her boat. Some of them are indeed physical objects such as musical instruments, but many are technologies like "basket weaving" or abstractions like "victory". It is not clarified in the poem how such things can be stored, handled, or displayed.

Not all of the mes are admirable or desirable traits. Alongside functions like "heroship" and "victory" are "the destruction of cities", "falsehood", and "enmity". The Sumerians apparently considered such evils and sins an inevitable part of humanity's experience in life, divinely and inscrutably decreed, and not to be questioned.

List of mes
Although more than one hundred mes appear to be mentioned in the latter myth, and the entire list is given four times, the tablets upon which it is found are so fragmentary that we have only a little over sixty of them.  In the order given, they are

 ENship
 Godship
 The exalted and enduring crown
 The throne of kingship
 The exalted sceptre
 The royal insignia
 The exalted shrine
 Shepherdship
 Kingship
 Lasting ladyship
 "Divine lady" (a priestly office)
 Ishib (a priestly office)
 Lumah (a priestly office)
 Guda (a priestly office)
 Truth
 Descent into the nether world
 Ascent from the nether world
 Kurgarra (a eunuch, or, possibly, ancient equivalent to modern concepts of androgyne or transgender)
 Girbadara (a eunuch)
 Sagursag (a eunuch, entertainers related to the cult of Inanna)
 The battle-standard
 The flood
 Weapons (?)
 Sexual intercourse
 Prostitution
 Law (?)
 Libel (?)
 Art
 The cult chamber
 "hierodule of heaven"
 Guslim (a musical instrument)
 Music
 Eldership
 Heroship
 Power
 Enmity
 Straightforwardness
 The destruction of cities
 Lamentation
 Rejoicing of the heart
 Falsehood
 Art of metalworking
 
 
 
 
 Scribeship
 Craft of the smith
 Craft of the leatherworker
 Craft of the builder
 Craft of the basket weaver
 Wisdom
 Attention
 Holy purification
 Fear
 Terror
 Strife
 Peace
 Weariness
 Victory
 Counsel
 The troubled heart
 Judgment
 Decision
 Lilis (a musical instrument)
 Ub (a musical instrument)
 Mesi (a musical instrument)
 Ala (a musical instrument)

See also
 Ancient Mesopotamia
 Enki
 Sumerian religion
 Me (cuneiform)

References

Citations

Bibliography 

 Emelianov, Vladimir (2009). Shumerskij kalendarnyj ritual (kategorija ME i vesennije prazdniki) (Calendar ritual in Sumerian religion and culture (ME's and the Spring Festivals)). St.-Petersburg, Peterburgskoje vostokovedenje, Orientalia.
 Farber-Flügge, Gertrud (1973). Der Mythos "Inanna und Enki" unter besonderer Berücksichtigung der Liste der me  (The myth of "Inanna and Enki" under special consideration of the list of the me). PhD thesis, University of Munich, Faculty of Philosophy; Rome: Biblical Institute Press. Vol. 10 of Studia Pohl, Dissertationes scientificae de rebus orientis antiqui.
 Kramer, Samuel Noah (1963). The Sumerians: Their History, Culture, and Character. Chicago: The University of Chicago Press. 
 
 Meador, Betty Shong De (2001). Inanna, Lady of Largest Heart: Poems of the Sumerian High Priestess Enheduanna. Texas: University of Texas Press.

External links 
 The Sumerian Mythology FAQ
 Inana and Enki cuneiform source translation at ETCSL (The Electronic Text Corpus of Sumerian Literature, University of Oxford, England)

Mesopotamian mythology